The UC Berkeley Symphony Orchestra is an orchestra of the University of California, Berkeley. It was founded in 1923, and is currently under the direction of David Milnes. Its home concert hall is Hertz Hall on the university's campus.

The orchestra has been party to masterclasses with conductors including Marin Alsop, Gustavo Dudamel, Valery Gergiev, Riccardo Muti, and Esa-Pekka Salonen. The orchestra has premiered many pieces by Berkeley composers.

References

University orchestras
University of California, Berkeley
Orchestras based in California
1923 establishments in California